Henry 'Model T' Ford (November 1, 1931 – June 10, 2021) was an American football defensive back for the Cleveland Browns and Pittsburgh Steelers of the NFL, drafted in 1955 by Cleveland. A quarterback at the University of Pittsburgh, Ford was the first African-American to play that position at a major college. After being drafted, he spent the 1955 season with the Browns and 1956-'57 with the Steelers. He was awarded the Pittsburgh Pro Football Hall of Fame's President's Award in 2015 for "displaying superior courage,
integrity and professionalism beyond the playing field". Henry Ford died on June 10, 2021.

References

1931 births
2021 deaths
American football defensive backs
Pittsburgh Panthers football players
Cleveland Browns players
Pittsburgh Steelers players
Players of American football from Pennsylvania
People from Homestead, Pennsylvania